Dora is an unincorporated community in Jefferson County, in the U.S. state of Pennsylvania.

History
Dora contained a post office from 1883 until 1974.

References

Unincorporated communities in Jefferson County, Pennsylvania
Unincorporated communities in Pennsylvania